Cyperus cruentus is a species of sedge that is native to parts of eastern Africa and the Arabian peninsula.

The species was first formally described by the botanist Christen Friis Rottbøll in 1773.

See also 
 List of Cyperus species

References 

cruentus
Taxa named by Christen Friis Rottbøll
Plants described in 1773
Flora of Kenya
Flora of Ethiopia
Flora of Eritrea
Flora of Malawi
Flora of Mozambique
Flora of Sudan
Flora of Saudi Arabia
Flora of Tanzania
Flora of Somalia
Flora of Uganda
Flora of Yemen
Flora of Zambia
Flora of Zimbabwe